The Preto River is a river of Bahia state in eastern Brazil. It is a tributary of the Jequié or Das Almas River.

See also
List of rivers of Bahia

References
Brazilian Ministry of Transport

Rivers of Bahia